Marco Mordente (born January 7, 1979) is an Italian former professional basketball player. He also represented the Italian national basketball team. He played at the point guard position.

Career 

In 1998 while he was playing for Olimpia Milano he lost the final match of Saporta Cup against Žalgiris Kaunas; in 2003 his team, Siena, reached the third place in Euroleague.
He has won Italian title in 2006 with Benetton and with the same team he won Italian Supercup 2006 and Italian Cup 2007.

National team career 

Mordente wore Italian jersey of youth team at European Championship of 1995 and 1998; he was a member of Italian senior roster at European Championship in 2005 and World Championship in 2006.

External links
Euroleague.net Player Profile
Legabasket.it Player Profile

1979 births
Living people
Competitors at the 2005 Mediterranean Games
Italian men's basketball players
Juvecaserta Basket players
Mediterranean Games gold medalists for Italy
Mens Sana Basket players
Olimpia Milano players
Pallacanestro Treviso players
Pallacanestro Virtus Roma players
People from Teramo
Pallacanestro Reggiana players
Viola Reggio Calabria players
2006 FIBA World Championship players
Point guards
Shooting guards
Mediterranean Games medalists in basketball
Sportspeople from the Province of Teramo